David Jacobs (born March 3, 1942) is a retired American trampoline gymnast. During the 1960s, he won several top-level trampolining medals.

Life and career
Jacobs was born in Sheboygan, Wisconsin, to Careta and her husband. The family moved to Amarillo, Texas, in 1957, and moved back to Sheboygan in 1965. While a sophomore, he joined Nard's trampoline club in Texas.

In 1964, he competed at the Amateur Athletic Union (AAU) championships and finished third. While there, he began a working relationship with Eddie Cole.

Jacobs was a student at the University of Michigan (U of M) during the 1960s. At the 1966 Trampoline World Championships (TWC), he won the synchronized trampoline title with fellow Michigan student Wayne Miller.

He is also known for his unintentional appearance on the reality TV series Impractical Jokers. In the 2019 episode "Irritable Vowel Syndrome", a 77-year-old Jacobs was shopping at a Fairway Market, when he met comedian Brian Quinn, who was performing a challenge for the show. Quinn started a conversation with Jacobs afterwards, where Jacobs said that he was a "superhuman athlete." The other members of the group then went up to Jacobs and pretended that they were fans and took a picture with him.

References

American male trampolinists
Living people
Medalists at the Trampoline Gymnastics World Championships
University of Michigan alumni
1942 births
20th-century American people